Princess Marie Louise of Hanover and Cumberland (11 October 1879 – 31 January 1948) was the eldest child of Ernest Augustus, Crown Prince of Hanover, and Princess Thyra of Denmark, the youngest daughter of Christian IX of Denmark and Louise of Hesse-Kassel. Through her father, Marie Louise was a great-great-granddaughter of George III of the United Kingdom and Charlotte of Mecklenburg-Strelitz. She was a first cousin of Nicholas II of Russia, Constantine I of Greece, Christian X of Denmark, Haakon VII of Norway and Queen Maud of Norway and George V of the United Kingdom.

Marriage and children

Marie Louise married Prince Maximilian of Baden (1867–1929), her third cousin twice removed, on 10 July 1900 in Gmunden, Austria-Hungary. He was the son of Prince Wilhelm of Baden and his wife Princess Maria Maximilianovna of Leuchtenberg and became a first cousin twice removed of Napoleon III of France. Marie Louise and Maximilian had one daughter and one son:

Princess Marie Alexandra of Baden (1 August 1902 – 29 January 1944). Married Prince Wolfgang Moritz of Hesse-Kassel, a son of Prince Frederick Charles of Hesse-Kassel and Princess Margaret of Prussia. Marie Alexandra was killed in a bombing of Frankfurt by the Allies of World War II.
Berthold, Margrave of Baden (24 February 1906 – 27 October 1963). Married Princess Theodora of Greece and Denmark, a daughter of Prince Andrew of Greece and Denmark and Princess Alice of Battenberg. Prince Berthold was the brother-in-law of Philip, Duke of Edinburgh.

Ancestry

House of Hanover
House of Zähringen
1879 births
1948 deaths
British princesses
Hanoverian princesses
People from Gmunden
Princesses of Baden